Phyllidiopsis sphingis is a species of sea slug, a dorid nudibranch, a shell-less marine gastropod mollusk in the family Phyllidiidae.

Distribution 
This species was described from Pupukea, Oahu, Hawaii. It has been reported from Papua New Guinea, the Coral Sea, the northern Mariana Islands and the Philippines.

Description
This nudibranch has a white dorsum grading to blue at the edges. There are four longitudinal black lines interspersed with three raised ridges. The outer black lines have extensions at right angles which radiate out towards the edge of the mantle. These lines are interspersed with spots or short lines. It is a small Phyllidiid, growing to about 25 mm in length. The rhinophores are white.

Diet
This species feeds on a sponge.

References

Phyllidiidae
Gastropods described in 1993